She Shall Have Murder is a 1950 British drama film directed by Daniel Birt and starring Rosamund John, Derrick De Marney and Felix Aylmer. The screenplay concerns a law office clerk who becomes a detective.

Premise
A law office clerk who aspires to be a crime writer, turns into a detective when someone at her work is murdered.

Cast
 Rosamund John as  Jane Hamish
 Derrick De Marney as  Dagobert Brown
 Mary Jerrold as  Mrs. Robjohn
 Felix Aylmer as  Mr. Playfair
 Joyce Heron as  Rosemary Proctor
 Jack Allen as  Maj. Stewart
 Henryetta Edwards as  Sarah Swinburne
 Harry Fowler as  Albert Oates
 John Bentley as  Douglas Robjohn
 Beatrice Varley as  Mrs. Hawthorne
 June Elvin as  Barbara Jennings
 Jack McNaughton as  Barman
 Olaf Pooley as  Mr. White
 Dennis Val Norton as  Pub Landlord
 Francis de Wolff as  Police Inspector
 Jonathan Field as  Darts Player
 Jimmy Rhodes as  Racing Man
 Tony Hilton as  Steward
 Frances Leak as  Shooting Gallery Attendant
 Wanda Rands s  Change Girl
 Duncan Lamont as  Police Sergeant

References

External links

1950 films
1950 crime drama films
Films directed by Daniel Birt
British crime drama films
British black-and-white films
Films scored by Eric Spear
1950s English-language films
1950s British films